In molecular biology, the CHB HEX N-terminal domain represents the N-terminal domain in chitobiases and beta-hexosaminidases. Chitobiases degrade chitin, which forms the exoskeleton in insects and crustaceans, and which is one of the most abundant polysaccharides on earth. Beta-hexosaminidases are composed of either a HexA/HexB heterodimer or a HexB homodimer, and can hydrolyse diverse substrates, including GM(2)-gangliosides; mutations in this enzyme are associated with Tay–Sachs disease. HexB is structurally similar to chitobiase, consisting of a beta sandwich structure; this structure is similar to that found in the cellulose-binding domain of cellulase from Cellulomonas fimi. This domain may function as a carbohydrate binding module.

References

Protein domains